Lawrence Carter may refer to:

 Lawrence Carter (historian), American historian, professor, author, and civil rights expert
 Lawrence Carter (1641–1710), English lawyer and politician
 Lawrence Carter (judge) (1668–1745), English judge and politician